Late Night Tales: Lindstrøm is a 2007 DJ mix, the 18th released in the Late Night Tales series by Night Time Stories. It was mixed and produced by the Norwegian DJ Lindstrøm.

Track listing

References

Lindstrom
2007 compilation albums
Hans-Peter Lindstrøm albums
DJ mix albums